"Accidentally on Purpose" is a ballad by George Jones. It was composed by Jones and Darrell Edwards and released it as the B-side to "Sparkling Brown Eyes" on Mercury Records in 1960. In the song, the narrator accuses a former lover of marrying another man just to spite him. The song made the top 20, peaking at No. 16 on the Billboard country singles chart. Johnny Cash recorded the song in 1962 for his LP The Sound of Johnny Cash.

Chart performance

References

George Jones songs
1960 singles
1960 songs
Songs written by George Jones
Mercury Records singles
Song recordings produced by Pappy Daily